Peter Michael Gordon Brown (born 1 September 1961) is a New Zealand rugby league footballer agent and a former footballer who represented New Zealand. His position of preference was at prop.

Playing career
Brown was a Te Atatu Roosters player in the Auckland Rugby League competition and also represented Auckland.

Brown also spent four off-seasons in England, playing for Hunslet, Salford, Halifax and Leigh.

He was first selected for the New Zealand national rugby league team in 1986 and went on to play in sixteen tests, with his final appearance being in 1991. He was part of the Kiwis squad that lost the final of the 1985-1988 World Cup to Australia.

County Cup Final appearances
Peter Brown played right-, i.e. number 10, and scored two conversions in Salford's 17-22 defeat by Wigan in the 1988 Lancashire County Cup Final during the 1988–89 season at Knowsley Road, St. Helens on Sunday 23 October 1988.

Later years
Brown is now a player agent, working alongside Frank Endacott.

References

External links
Player listing at nzrl.co.nz

1961 births
Living people
Auckland rugby league team players
Halifax R.L.F.C. players
Hunslet R.L.F.C. players
Leigh Leopards players
New Zealand rugby league players
New Zealand national rugby league team players
Rugby league players from Auckland
Rugby league player agents
Rugby league props
Salford Red Devils players
Souths Logan Magpies players
Te Atatu Roosters players